Begun in 1898 in rural Frederick County, Maryland, the LeGore Bridge was completed and opened to the public in 1900. It was built and maintained by the owners of the LeGore Lime Company, including local businessman James William LeGore and his company advisor, Eugene Hammond. The bridge is situated at 39°35'N 77°19'W. The five arch limestone bridge was restored in 1981 and 2009.

The bridge was built for three purposes:

as part of a hydroelectric dam for an electric railway going from the Nation's Capital to Gettysburg, Pennsylvania,
for transport of limestone from the LeGore Quarry to sales companies in Pennsylvania, and
to accommodate the state-owned road for public travel across the Monocacy River.

Only the last of these panned out, and the LeGore Bridge is still used for everyday automobile traffic.

It was listed on the National Register of Historic Places in 1978.

References

External links
, including undated photo, at Maryland Historical Trust
LeGore Bridge undergoes $1.06M repair

Bridges completed in 1900
Road bridges on the National Register of Historic Places in Maryland
Bridges in Frederick County, Maryland
National Register of Historic Places in Frederick County, Maryland
Monocacy River
Stone arch bridges in the United States